Herpothallon is a genus of crustose lichens in the family Arthoniaceae. It has about 50 species.

Taxonomy
The genus was circumscribed in 1930 by German lichenologist Friedrich Tobler, with Herpothallon sanguineum assigned as the type species. Tobler erroneously believed that the fungus was a member of the Basidiomycota. After it was recognized as an ascolichen, it was referred to either Chiodecton (family Roccellaceae) or Cryptothecia (family Arthoniaceae).

In 2009, Herpothallon was resurrected following a publication by André Aptroot, Göran Thor, Robert Lücking, and John Elix, in which they recognized 29 species worldwide. The type species is now known as Herpothallon rubrocinctum, or in the vernacular as the "Christmas lichen".

Description
Herpothallon is characterized by the byssoid (a wispy or cottony texture) prothallus (i.e., the first purely fungal layer upon which an algae-containing thallus develops) and hypothallus (i.e., a growth of undifferentiated purely fungal mycelium present as a distinct layer on the underside of the thallus). The texture of the thallus is somewhat felt-like, and its form is heteromerous, meaning that more or less distinct tissues are present, in particular, the mycobiont and photobiont components occur in well-marked layers, with the photobiont in a more or less distinct zone between the upper cortex and the medulla. Another thallus feature common to all species is the felty pseudoisidia; these are isidia-like outgrowths that, unlike true isidia, lack internal differentiation and have no distinct cortex. The thallus also has pustules (blister-like elevations), and granules ranging in form and size from soredia-like to minute. The photobiont partner of the Herpothallon  lichen is from Trentepohlia, a genus of green algae. In Herpothallon, the asci do not develop in true ascomata. Only two members of the genus, H. fertile and H. inopinatum, are known to be fertile.

Species

, Species Fungorum accepts 42 species of Herpothallon.
Herpothallon adnatum 
Herpothallon alae  – Vanuatu
Herpothallon aurantiacoflavum 
Herpothallon australasicum 
Herpothallon biacidum  – Australia
Herpothallon brialmonticum 
Herpothallon capilliferum  – China
Herpothallon cinereum 
Herpothallon confluenticum 
Herpothallon confusum 
Herpothallon corallinum 
Herpothallon coralloides  – Andaman Islands
Herpothallon echinatum 
Herpothallon elegans 
Herpothallon fertile 
Herpothallon flavominutum  – India
Herpothallon furfuraceum 
Herpothallon globosum 
Herpothallon globuliferum  – Andaman Islands
Herpothallon granulare 
Herpothallon granulosum  – India
Herpothallon himalayanum  – India
Herpothallon hypoprotocetraricum 
Herpothallon hyposticticum  – Galápagos Islands
Herpothallon inopinatum  – Mexico
Herpothallon isidiatum  – India
Herpothallon japonicum 
Herpothallon kigeziense  – Uganda
Herpothallon lutescens  – Andaman Islands
Herpothallon minimum 
Herpothallon minutum  – Andaman Islands
Herpothallon nigroisidiatum 
Herpothallon philippinum 
Herpothallon polyisidiatum  – China
Herpothallon purpureum  – Brazil
Herpothallon pustulatum 
Herpothallon queenslandicum 
Herpothallon roseocinctum 
Herpothallon rubrocinctoides 
Herpothallon rubrocinctum 
Herpothallon rubroechinatum 
Herpothallon rubromaculatum 
Herpothallon saxorum  – Galápagos Islands
Herpothallon subglobosum  – China
Herpothallon viridi-isidiatum  – China
Herpothallon weii  – China

References

Cited literature
 

Arthoniomycetes
Lichen genera
Arthoniomycetes genera
Taxa described in 1937